Savino is a rural locality (a village) in Yudinskoye Rural Settlement, Velikoustyugsky District, Vologda Oblast, Russia. The population was 1 as of 2002.

Geography 
The distance to Veliky Ustyug is 16 km, to Yudino is 15 km. Knyaginino is the nearest rural locality.

References 

Rural localities in Velikoustyugsky District